Telangana Today is a registered English-language Indian daily newspaper headquartered in Hyderabad, Telangana, India. The publication aims to focus mainly on politics and developments of the state of Telangana. The newspaper is published by Telangana Publications Pvt. Ltd which is owned by K. Chandrashekar Rao, the current Chief minister of Telangana and founder of Telangana Rashtra Samithi.

The newspaper is also available in ePaper format.

History
It was launched on December 15, 2016. It is a sister publication of a Telugu daily, Namasthe Telangana and the TV channel T News.

Circulation and revenue 
Based on the data obtained from Right to Information, classified advertising expenditure of the Government of Telangana on Telangana Today increased 17-fold between 2016 and 2018.

See also 
 List of newspapers in India
 List of newspapers in India by circulation
 List of newspapers in the world by circulation

References

External links 
 Telangana Today website
 Telangana Today ePaper

Daily newspapers published in India
Newspapers published in Hyderabad
Publications established in 2016
2016 establishments in Telangana